Steven Mark Zucker (12 September 1949 – 13 September 2019) was an American mathematician who introduced the Zucker conjecture, proved in different ways by Eduard Looijenga (1988) and by Leslie Saper and Mark Stern (1990).

Zucker completed his Ph.D. in 1974 at Princeton University under the supervision of Spencer Bloch.  His work with David A. Cox led to the creation of the Cox–Zucker machine, an algorithm for determining if a given set of sections provides a basis (up to torsion) for the Mordell–Weil group of an elliptic surface , where  is isomorphic to the projective line.

He was part of the mathematics faculty at the Johns Hopkins University. In 2012, he became a fellow of the American Mathematical Society.

Bibliography

Saper, Leslie; Stern, Mark L2-cohomology of arithmetic varieties, Annals of Mathematics (2) 132 (1990), no. 1, 1–69.

References

External links

1949 births
2019 deaths
Algebraic geometers
Princeton University alumni
Johns Hopkins University faculty
Fellows of the American Mathematical Society
20th-century American mathematicians
21st-century American mathematicians
Mathematicians from Maryland
Scientists from Baltimore